Pethia sanjaymoluri, Sanjay's black-tip pethia, is a species of ray finned fish from the subfamily Barbinae, of the family Cyprinidae. It is found in the Pavana and Nira rivers which are tributaries of the Bhima River, part of Krishna River system in Maharashtra, India.

References

Fish of India
sanjaymoluri
Taxa named by Neelesh Dahanukar
Taxa named by Rajeev Raghavan
Fish described in 2016